The 195th Wing is a unit of the California Air National Guard, stationed at Beale Air Force Base, California.  If mobilized, the wing would be assigned to Air Force Space Command.  It comprises seven subordinate units at five locations throughout the state. The 195th controls all non-flying, non-kinetic  operations for the California Air National Guard. The wing was activated as the headquarters for California Air National Guard space, cyber, and intelligence, surveillance & reconnaissance units.

From 1970 through 1974, the wing flew Lockheed C-130 Hercules aircraft from Van Nuys Air National Guard Base as the 195th Tactical Airlift Group.

Today the wing's mission is to train, deploy and employ its airmen and assets to deliver integrated space, cyber, and intelligence, surveillance & reconnaissance capabilities to the Combatant Commands and the Governor of California.

Organization
 195th Intelligence, Surveillance and Reconnaissance Group, 1 September 2015 – present
 149th Intelligence Squadron (Mather Field, California)
 222d Intelligence Support Squadron
 234th Intelligence Squadron
 195th Operations Group, 1 September 2015 – present (Van Nuys, California)
 147th Combat Communications Squadron
 148th Space Operations Squadron (Vandenberg Air Force Base, California)
 216th Space Control Squadron (Vandenberg Air Force Base, California) - the federal mission of the 216th is to provide combat space superiority effects to the Commander, Combined Force Space Component Command and Space Operations Command under U.S. Space Force, and theater combatant commanders. The unit’s space operators deploy globally to conduct mobile and transportable space superiority and evaluate and operate new counter-space technologies.
 261st Cyber Operations Squadron (Van Nuys, California)

History

Airlift group
The 195th Tactical Airlift Group was formed as the headquarters for the 195th Tactical Airlift Squadron in 1971 Van Nuys Air National Guard Base and was initially equipped with the Lockheed C-130A Hercules.  In 1973, the group upgraded to the C-130B model of the Hercules.  As the Vietnam War wound down, the demand for airlift decreased and the 146th Tactical Airlift Wing was reduced in size by inactivating the 195th Group and its components on 30 September 1974. The group's personnel, equipment and aircraft were reassigned to other units of the 146th Wing.

Composite wing
In August 2015, the California Air National Guard announced that it was forming a new wing to manage its military intelligence, space, cyber and combat communications missions.  The core of the new wing would be the 162d Combat Communications Group, which would be inactivated when the wing stood up.  Preparations for establishing the wing went back as far as 2001, when the 162d Group added units whose mission complemented its core combat communications mission.

Lineage
 Constituted as the 195th Tactical Airlift Group and allotted to the Air National Guard on 30 December 1969
 Activated on 15 May 1971
 Federally recognized on 7 October 1971
 Inactivated on 30 September 1974
 Redesignated 195th Wing and activated on 1 September 2015.

Assignments
 146th Air Transport Wing (later 146th Military Airlift Wing), by 1962 – 14 April 1970
 146th Tactical Airlift Wing, 15 May 1971 – 30 September 1974
 California Air National Guard, 1 September 2015 – present

Components
 Groups
 195th Intelligence, Surveillance and Reconnaissance Group, 1 September 2015 – present
 195th Operations Group, 1 September 2015 – present

 Squadrons
 195th Air Transport Squadron (later 195th Military Airlift Squadron, 195th Tactical Airlift Squadron), by November 1962 – 14 April 1970, 15 May 1971 – 30 September 1974
 195th Combat Support Squadron, 15 May 1971 – 30 September 1974
 195th Supply Squadron, 15 May 1971 – 30 September 1974

 Flights
 195th Aerial Port Flight, 15 May 1971 – 30 September 1974
 195th Civil Engineering Flight, 15 May 1971 – 30 September 1974
 195th Communications Flight, 15 May 1971 – 30 September 1974
 195th Comptroller Flight, 1 September 2015 – present
 195th Force Support Flight, 1 September 2015 – present

 Medical
 195th Tactical Dispensary (later 195th Tactical Clinic), 15 May 1971 – 30 September 1974

Stations
 Van Nuys Air National Guard Base, November 1962 – 14 April 1970
 Van Nuys Air National Guard Base, 15 May 1971 – 30 September 1974
 Beale Air Force Base, 1 September 2015 – present

Aircraft
 Lockheed C-130 Hercules, 1971-1974

See also
 List of United States Air National Guard Groups & Wings
 List of C-130 Hercules operators

References
 Notes

 Citations

Bibliography and further reading

External links
 
 
 

0195
Wings of the United States Air National Guard
Military units and formations in California